The French Guiana Régional 1 is the highest tier of men's football in French Guiana. It was created in 1961 and is organized by the Ligue de Football de la Guyane. There are twelve participants in the league, with teams finishing in the two bottom spots being relegated to the Régional 2. The division is equivalent to the sixth tier of football in France, the Régional 1.

Despite being a league competition in CONCACAF, none of the French Guianan teams have recently played in the Caribbean Club Championship or the CONCACAF Champions League. Their last appearance was in the 1992 CONCACAF Champions' Cup, represented by ASC Le Geldar.

Clubs 

The following clubs competed during the 2021-2022 season.

Previous winners

1962–63 : Racing Club (Cayenne)
1963–64 : ASL Le Sport Guyanais (Cayenne)
1964–65 : AJ Saint-Georges (Cayenne)
1965–66 : ASL Le Sport Guyanais (Cayenne)
1966–67 : ASL Le Sport Guyanais (Cayenne)
1967–68 : ASL Le Sport Guyanais (Cayenne)
1968–69 : ASL Le Sport Guyanais (Cayenne)
1969–70 : ASL Le Sport Guyanais (Cayenne)
1970–71 : ASL Le Sport Guyanais (Cayenne)
1971–72 : ASL Le Sport Guyanais (Cayenne)
1972–73 : ASL Le Sport Guyanais (Cayenne)
1973–74 : ASL Le Sport Guyanais (Cayenne)
1974–75 : USL Montjoly (Montjoly)
1975–76 : USL Montjoly (Montjoly)
1976–77 : AS Club Colonial (Cayenne)
1977–78 : AS Club Colonial (Cayenne)
1978–79 : AS Club Colonial (Cayenne)
1979–80 : USL Montjoly (Montjoly)
1980–81 : USL Montjoly (Montjoly)
1981–82 : USL Montjoly (Montjoly)
1982–83 : AJ Saint-Georges (Cayenne)
1983–84 : AJ Saint-Georges (Cayenne)
1984–85 : ASC Le Geldar (Kourou)
1985–86 : ASL Le Sport Guyanais (Cayenne)
1986–87 : unknown
1987–88 : ASC Le Geldar (Kourou)
1988–89 : ASC Le Geldar (Kourou)
1989–90 : SC Kouroucien (Kourou)
1990–91 : AS Club Colonial (Cayenne)
1991–92 : AS Club Colonial (Cayenne)
1992–93 : US Sinnamary (Sinnamary)
1993–94 : US Sinnamary (Sinnamary)
1994–95 : AS Jahouvey (Mana)
1995–96 : AS Club Colonial (Cayenne)
1996–97 : US Sinnamary (Sinnamary)
1997–98 : AS Jahouvey (Mana)
1998–99 : AJ Saint-Georges (Cayenne)
1999–00 : AJ Saint-Georges (Cayenne)
2000–01 : ASC Le Geldar (Kourou)
2001–02 : AJ Saint-Georges (Cayenne)
2002–03 : US Matoury (Matoury)
2003–04 : ASC Le Geldar (Kourou)
2004–05 : ASC Le Geldar (Kourou)
2005–06 : US Matoury (Matoury)
2006–07 : US Macouria (Macouria)
2007–08 : ASC Le Geldar (Kourou)
2008–09 : ASC Le Geldar (Kourou)
2009–10 : ASC Le Geldar (Kourou)
2010–11 : US Matoury (Matoury)
2011–12 : US Matoury (Matoury)
2012–13 : ASC Le Geldar (Kourou)
2013–14 : US Matoury (Matoury)
2014–15 : CSC Cayenne (Cayenne)
2015–16 : US Matoury (Matoury)
2016–17 : US Matoury (Matoury)
2017–18 : ASC Le Geldar (Kourou)
2018–19 : ASC Agouado (Apatou)
2019–20 : Olympique Cayenne (Cayenne)
2020–21 : abandoned
2021–22 : abandoned
2022–23 :

Performance by club

Best Scorers

References

External links
Official Website

 
Football competitions in French Guiana
Top level football leagues in the Caribbean
Football leagues in Overseas France
1961 establishments in French Guiana
Sports leagues established in 1961